S. P. Balasubrahmanyam was an Indian playback singer, actor, music director, voice actor and film producer. He is mostly referred to as S. P. B. or Balu. He has won the Guinness World Record for recording the highest number of songs. He won the National Film Award for Best Male Playback Singer six times and the Nandi Awards in Telugu cinema 25 times from the Government of Andhra Pradesh. He has sung over 3,000 Telugu songs until date. The following is a list of the songs he sung in Kannada:

Film songs

1967

1969

1970

1971

1972

1973

1974

1975

1976

1977

1978

1979

1980

1981

1982

1983

1984

1985

1986

1987

1988

1989

1990

1991

1992

1993

1994

1995

1996

1997

1998

1999

2000s

2000

2001

2002

2003

2004

2004

2005

2006

2007

snehana preethina
nanna chanchale
v hari krishna
v nagendra prasad
shreya ghoshal

2008

2009

2010

2011–2021 

Non-film songs

Telugu / Kannada non-film songs

References 

Discographies of Indian artists
Discography
Balasubrahmanyam|S. P.